Miss Gay Philippines (MGP) is a gay beauty pageant in the Philippines. Considered the longest-running national gay beauty pageant in the Philippines, Miss Gay Philippines was founded in 1979 by entertainment journalist and talk show host Chito Alcid. Miss Gay Philippines is currently owned by the Betera Group.

History 
Miss Gay Philippines was founded in 1979 by Chito Alcid, a Filipino entertainment reporter and talk show host. Eddie Mercado, famous Filipino actor and sought-after beauty pageant host, was the original host of this competition. The pageant is intended to promote the integration of Filipino LGBT people into mainstream life in the Philippines. In an interview with the Daily Guardian, Alcid said, "[Miss Gay Philippines] is a platform for them to further develop their personality, how to be more productive gays, to be professional in dealing with people ... [and] remind them the importance of moral values and their relationship to society."

Following Alcid's death in 2013, the Miss Gay Philippines franchise was bought out by the Betera Group. The recipient of the Miss Gay Philippines — Universe title represented the Philippines at the Miss International Queen pageant held annually in Thailand until 2015, when media conglomerate Viva Entertainment and the city of Manila launched Miss Gay Manila.

Qualifications 
In order to qualify as a contestant for Miss Gay Philippines, contestants must fulfill these qualifications:
 Filipino identifying as gay, trans, or bisexual
 17 to 34 years old
 At least 5'4" in height
 Proportionate physique
 At least a high school diploma
 Have good communication skills
 Have good moral character
Gay, trans, and bisexual identities are blurred in Filipino culture in a third gender identity, bakla, in contrast to Western society's strict separation of gender and sexuality.

Potential contestants do not have to be career pageanteras in order to participate. Miss Gay Philippines contestants can also have national, city, or local neighborhood titles, but can participate without having received other pageant titles.

The screening process takes place in four steps leading up to coronation night. First, potential contestants must confirm their availability for orientation, photoshoots, and the pageant itself. Second, potential contestants go through a series of interviews to confirm their qualifications. Third, potential contestants must pay the applicable registration fee in order to become an official candidate. Fourth, all official candidates must attend orientation and pictorials.

Pageant events 
The Miss Gay Philippines pageant consists of traditional costumes, an opening number, swimsuits and evening gowns. After the evening gowns presentation, there is an elimination round to narrow down the contestants.

The last portion of the competition is a question-and-answer session with the remaining contestants. These question-and-answer segments are an essential part of the pageant. A smart, articulate response given by a contestant is a major factor in their pageant success. Afterwards, major titles and minor awards are awarded.

Pageants are judged by prominent figures in Filipino popular culture, including former beauty pageant queens. Previous judges include model and former beauty queen Evangeline Pascual, actress Susan Roces, Miss International pageant winner Melanie Marquez and actor Eddie Garcia.

Titles and awards 
Since its inception, there have been five main titles awarded. The 2017 pageant added an additional two main titles. All titles and awards come with a cash reward. The main titles awarded at Miss Gay Philippines are:
 Miss Gay Philippines Universe
 Miss Gay Philippines World
 Miss Gay Philippines Earth
 Miss Gay Philippines International
 Miss Gay Philippines Asia Pacific
 Miss Gay Philippines Grand International
 Miss Gay Philippines Globe
The minor awards are:
 Face of Betera
 People's Choice Award
 Best in Swimsuit
 Best in Evening Gown
 Placenta Awardee (awarded to 3 contestants)

Miss Gay Philippines titleholders 
Source

Significance 
Through the question-and-answer portions of the pageant, Miss Gay Philippines participants have the opportunity to advocate for LGBT equity in the Philippines on a national scale. Gay pageantry and cross-dressing is used as a source of healing for gay Filipino men. Filipino scholar and writer J. Neil Garcia has referenced Miss Gay Philippines in his works pertaining to Western notions of gender performativity and queer identities in the Philippines.

Miss Gay Philippines pageants has influenced the spread of gay beauty pageants in various barangays, local neighborhoods, throughout the Philippines. These gay beauty pageants often serve as fundraisers for local bakla communities. Many Miss Gay Philippines contestants have participated in these smaller gay beauty pageants.

Miss Gay Philippines pageants have also extended over to nations where Filipinos have migrated. LGBT Filipino immigrants have held similar Miss Gay Philippines pageants in Oslo and Toronto.

Notable participants 
2011 Miss Gay Philippines — Universe titleholder Trixie Maristela was crowned Miss International Queen, the largest trans beauty pageant in the world, in 2015. Maristela is the second entrant from the Philippines to win the title. Maristela has since appeared on Filipino television shows such as GMA's Karelasyon and Magkapailanman.

Ian Valdez, an actor who has appeared in Tagalog films such as Woman of Breakwater, was a Miss Gay Philippines contestant.

Controversies 
Miss Gay Philippines, along with other Filipino gay beauty pageants, are a large part of LGBT culture in the Philippines. However, Filipino gay beauty pageants, according to Justin Francis Bionat of the Filipino LGBT magazine Outrage Magazine, "do not necessarily promote being LGBT, as much as exploit those who join them."

Erriz Lanceta, the recipient of the 2012 Miss Gay Philippines — Universe title, came under fire for transphobic comments made toward Miss Universe Canada contestant Jenna Talackova. Talackova is the first trans woman to compete in the pageant after Miss Universe rules were revised to allow trans women to participate. In an interview with Bombo Radyo Iloilo, Lanceta made remarks toward Talackova and other trans women that questioned their ability to answer questions about being a "real woman."

Kristine Coronel and Vodca Dee, original crown holders of Miss Gay Philippines International and Asia Pacific 2015 respectively, were dethroned from their titles and as members of the Betera Group for repeated violation of section (e) of the memorandum of agreement for Miss Gay Philippines winners that prohibits talent from participating in lesser pageants. Toni Lopez and Tyra Syntangco replaced Kristine Coronel and Vodca Dee, respectively.

See also 
 Miss Gay America
 Miss International Queen
 Mr. Gay World Philippines Organization
 LGBT culture in the Philippines
 Trixie Maristela
 Jenna Talackova
 Miss Tiffany's Universe

References

External links 
 Miss Gay Philippines — Facebook 
 Trans Pageantry Philippines

LGBT beauty pageants
Beauty pageants in the Philippines
Philippine awards
LGBT in the Philippines
Transgender beauty pageants